There are currently nine United States congressional districts in Tennessee based on results from the 2020 United States census. There have been as few as eight and as many as thirteen congressional districts in Tennessee. The  was briefly lost after the 1970 census but was regained after the 1980 census.

Current districts and representatives
List of members of the United States House delegation from Tennessee, their terms, their district boundaries, and the district political ratings according to the CPVI. The delegation has a total of 9 members, with 8 Republicans, and 1 Democrat.

Historical and present district boundaries
Table of United States congressional district boundary maps in the State of Tennessee, presented chronologically. All redistricting events that took place in Tennessee between 1973 and 2013 are shown.

Obsolete districts
 , obsolete since statehood
  (1796–1805; 1873–1875)
 , obsolete since the 1950 census
 , obsolete since the 1850 census
 , obsolete since the 1840 census
 , obsolete since the 1840 census

See also

List of United States congressional districts
Baker v. Carr

References

 
Congressional districts